Die rote Fahne des Ostens ('The Red Flag of the East') was a newspaper published from Königsberg. It was the organ of the East Prussia-Danzig organization (bezirk) of the Communist Party of Germany. It functioned as the local edition of the Berlin-based newspaper Die Rote Fahne between 1919 and September 1922. During this period Martin Hoffmann served as editor of the newspaper. Erich Wollenberg became the editor-in-chief of Die rote Fahne des Ostens in 1922. In 1922 Die rote Fahne des Ostens was replaced by Echo des Ostens.

References

German-language communist newspapers
Communist Party of Germany
Defunct newspapers published in Germany
Mass media in Kaliningrad
Newspapers established in 1919
Publications disestablished in 1922